Narendra Kumar Pandey, popularly known as Sunil Pandey, is an Indian politician from Bihar.

He was first elected in 2000 in the Piro constituency for the Samta Party. He was re-elected three times. In the assembly election of February 2005 he won by a margin of 35679. Because of all the parties failed to form government, President's rule was imposed in the State and after a few months Bihar's state assembly was dissolved, elections were held again in October month in which NDA came to power with Nitish Kumar as the Chief Minister and in the same year he went in JD(U) before election and lodged his victory again.

Pandey was nominated as the Chairman of Agriculture and Industrial Development committee of Bihar. Before the state assembly election of 2015 he resigned from JD(U) on 25 September 2015 after completing his successful 4 elections. He later joined LJP as a spokesman.

References

Living people
Janata Dal (United) politicians
Bihar MLAs 2005–2010
Bihar MLAs 2010–2015
People from Arrah
People from Rohtas District
People from Bihar
People from Bhojpur district, India
Lok Janshakti Party politicians
Year of birth missing (living people)